Derbyshire County Cricket Club in 1888 was the cricket season when the English club Derbyshire had been playing for seventeen years and it was the first season they lost first class status.

1888 season

Although deprived of first class status Derbyshire played the same opponents as in the previous year with two matches each against Lancashire, Yorkshire, Surrey and Essex and one match each against Leicestershire and Middlesex . They also played one match against MCC and one against the touring Australians. Derbyshire won three of their matches and lost the remaining nine.

The captain for the year was William Chatterton who was also top scorer. John Hulme took most wickets. His total of 60 included 15 in one match against Yorkshire.

Of those who made their debut, Edward Evershed and Herbert Mosby  played regularly over the following years before Derbyshire regained first class status. Evershed also played a first class game in 1898 as did Alfred Charlesworth who otherwise only played in the 1888 season. WA Hindley and JH Straw played their one-game each for Derbyshire in 1888 while William Hodges   a schoolboy from Cheltenham College and William Pedley a former Sussex player each played two games in the season.

Matches

Statistics

Batting averages

Bowling averages

Wicket keeping

James Disney Catches 7 Stumping 4

See also
Derbyshire County Cricket Club seasons
1888 English cricket season

References

1888 in English cricket
Derbyshire County Cricket Club seasons
English cricket seasons in the 19th century